Daptus is a genus of beetles in the family Carabidae first described by Fischer von Waldheim in 1823.

Species 
Daptus contains the following three species:
 Daptus komarowi Semenov, 1889
 Daptus pictus Fischer von Waldheim, 1823
 Daptus vittatus Fischer von Waldheim, 1823

References

Harpalinae